Simien or Semien may mean:

People
Wayne Simien, an American professional basketball player
Terrance Simien, a U.S. zydeco musician, accordionist and songwriter
Tracy Simien, a former NFL football player

Places
Simien Mountains, Ethiopia
Semien Mountains National Park

See also
Simian, "pertaining to apes"
Simian (disambiguation)
Simion, a Romanian name